Caloptilia quercinigrella is a moth of the family Gracillariidae. It is known from Connecticut, Illinois, Florida, Georgia, Maine, Maryland, Michigan and Texas in the United States.

The wingspan is about 14 mm.

The larvae feed on Quercus species, including Quercus nigra. They mine the leaves of their host plant. They feed in a leaf cone. The larva chews a series of small holes through the leaf, both alongside the basal edge of the cone and on the adjacent area of the cone itself.

References

External links
Povolnya at microleps.org
mothphotographersgroup
Bug Guide

quercinigrella
Moths described in 1915
Moths of North America